Wokha Assembly constituency is one of the 60 Legislative Assembly constituencies of Nagaland state in India. It is part of Wokha District and is reserved for candidates belonging to the Scheduled Tribes. It is also part of Nagaland Lok Sabha constituency.

Members of Legislative Assembly
 1964: N . L . Odyüo, Independent
 1969: N . L . Odyüo, Naga Nationalist Organisation
 1974: Mhao Lotha, United Democratic Front
 1977: Rainbow Ezüng, Independent
 1982: Mhao Lotha, Naga National Democratic Party
 1987: John Lotha, Independent
 1989: T. Myingthungo Lotha, Nagaland People's Council
 1993: John Lotha, Indian National Congress
 1998: John Lotha, Indian National Congress
 2003: Dr. T. M. Lotha, Bharatiya Janata Party
 2008: Dr. Chümben Murry, Nationalist Congress Party
 2013: Dr. T. M. Lotha, Bharatiya Janata Party

Election results

2018

See also
List of constituencies of the Nagaland Legislative Assembly
Wokha district
 Nagaland
 Nagaland (Lok Sabha constituency)

References

Wokha
Assembly constituencies of Nagaland